The Man Farthest Down: A Record of Observation and Study in Europe (1911) is a book written by Booker T. Washington of Tuskegee University "with the collaboration of" sociologist Robert E. Park. The book is a record of the observations and studies of the authors during their travels in Europe, where they visited various cities and observed the living conditions of the urban poor, particularly in the industrial centers, as well as that of marginalized groups in Europe such as Jews and Roma people (referred to as Gypsies).

Background 

Through their observations and research, Washington and Park aimed to shed light on the struggles faced by the working class in Europe and to offer insights into how these issues might be addressed. The book is also significant in its representation of the collaboration between a prominent African-American leader (Washington) and a white sociologist (Park) during a time of heightened racial tensions in the United States.

The book begins, "On 20 August, 1910, I sailed from New York City for Liverpool, England. I had been given a leave of absence for two months from my work at Tuskegee, on condition that I would spend that time in some way that would give me recreation and rest. Now I have found that almost the only comfortable and satisfactory way for me to rest is to find some new kind of work or occupation. I determined therefore to carry out a plan I had long had in mind of making myself acquainted with the condition of the poor and working classes in Europe, particularly in those regions from which an ever – increasing number of immigrants are coming to our country each year."

References 

1912 non-fiction books
English-language books
Non-fiction books about racism